Two ships of the Royal Navy of Oman have been named Shabab Oman:

 , a barquentine
 , a full-rigged ship

Ship names